Aleksandar Matović (born 3 January 1978) is a Serbian basketball coach who is currently an assistant coach for Partizan Belgrade of the Serbian KLS, the Adriatic League and the EuroLeague.

Coaching career 
Matović started his coaching career as a youth coach for Borac Čačak and Partizan. Later, Matović was the head coach of Superfund.

In August 2015, Matović became an assistant coach of AEK under Dragan Šakota. In July 2016, he became an assistant coach for Budućnost under Vlado Šćepanović.

Individually through the years, Matović was a player development coach for many NBA players, such as Klay Thompson, Mychel Thompson, Goran Dragić, Zoran Dragić, Semih Erden, Sasha Vujačić, Andris Biedriņš, and Vladimir Radmanović.

Partizan (2017–present) 
In summer 2017, Matović became an assistant coach for Partizan NIS under Miroslav Nikolić. In mid-December 2017, Matović was the interim head coach for Partizan following departure of coach Nikolić. On 13 December, he coached the Partizan team in a 83–67 loss to RETAbet Bilbao Basket. On the next day, Matović joined staff of Nenad Čanak who was hired as the new Partizan head coach.

In October 2018, Matović was named the interim head coach for Partizan following departure of coach Čanak. On 31 October, Matović had a 77–72 loss to Turk Telecom. Matović finished his second stint as the interim head coach with one lost when new head coach Andrea Trinchieri was hired on 1 November, joining his coaching staff as assistant.

On 8 March 2021, Partizan NIS hired Matović as their new head coach for the rest of the 2020–21 season. Two days later, he made his official debut in a 75–70 loss to Metropolitans 92. Following this lost, Partizan was eliminated in the Top 16 stage of the 2020–21 EuroCup season. He left the head coach position in June 2021, following arrival of the new head coach Željko Obradović. In August, he was named back as an assistant coach for Partizan under Obradović.

National teams 
In June 2021, Matović was added to the coaching staff of Serbia men's national team under Igor Kokoškov as a player development coach.

Career achievements 
As assistant coach
 Serbian Cup winner: 3 (with Partizan: 2017–18, 2018–19, 2019–20)
 ABA Super Cup winner: 1 (with Partizan: 2019)

Coaching record

EuroCup 

|- 
| align="left" |Partizan
| align="left" |2017–18
| 1 || 0 || 1 ||  || align="center" rowspan=2|Interim head coach
|- 
| align="left" |Partizan
| align="left" |2018–19
| 1 || 0 || 1 || 
|- 
| align="left" |Partizan
| align="left" |2020–21
| 1 || 0 || 1 ||  || align="center"|Eliminated in Top 16 stage
|-class="sortbottom"
| align="center" colspan=2|Career||3||0||3||||

See also 
 List of KK Partizan head coaches

References

External links
 Aleksandar Matović at euroleaguebasketball.net
 Aleksandar Matović at eurobasket.com
 Aleksandar Matović at aba-liga.com

1978 births
Living people
KK Partizan coaches
KK Superfund coaches
Serbian men's basketball coaches
Serbian expatriate basketball people in Greece
Serbian expatriate basketball people in Montenegro
Sportspeople from Čačak